Tony Briffa (legal and birth name Antoinette Briffa) is a Maltese-Australian politician who is notable for being the world's first known intersex and non-binary mayor and public officeholder.

Briffa has partial androgen insensitivity syndrome, and is mayor of the City of Hobsons Bay, Victoria.

Briffa was raised as a girl, then lived for a time as a man, and now chooses to live as both female and male. Briffa is one of the first people to be public about their experience of being mistreated by doctors as a result of their intersex variation, and about intersex human rights.

Early life 

Tony Briffa was born in Altona, Victoria with partial androgen insensitivity syndrome.  In an article on SBS News, Antoinette explained that she had her first surgeries when she was just a baby and had further procedures including the removal of healthy gonads.  She also explains that she was born with a female body including female genitalia.

Speaking to a 2013 Australian Senate inquiry into the Involuntary or coerced sterilisation of intersex people in Australia, Briffa describes how doctors "convinced my mother to approve me to be castrated" (i.e. the removal of her internal testes without her consent):

Career 
Briffa has worked in positions with the Department of Defence and the Australian Federal Police. Briffa is the world's first openly intersex public mayor, and "the first known intersex public office-bearer in the Western world", serving as Deputy Mayor of the City of Hobsons Bay, Victoria, between 2009 and 2011, and Mayor between 2011–2012. Briffa resigned as a local councillor on 14 February 2014, effective on the appointment of a successor. In October 2016, Briffa was re-elected to Hobsons Bay City Council.

Briffa has previously served as the President of the Genetic Support Network of Victoria, Board Member and Secretary of ILGA World, Co-executive director of Intersex Human Rights Australia (formerly OII Australia) and long term President of Intersex Peer Support Australia (formerly the Androgen Insensitivity Syndrome Support Group Australia;.  Briffa was also a Foster Carer of several children, a member of numerous Victorian Government Ministerial Advisory Committees since 2001, a current member of the Victorian Government LGBTIQ Taskforce.  She is also the Co-chair of the Victorian Government's Intersex Expert Advisory Group.

Selected bibliography 
 
 
 
 
 Parts of Briffa's life story are depicted in a short online animation.

Personal life

Birth certificate 
Tony Briffa's original and current birth certificate recognises her sex as female, but she had previously obtained a birth certificate with a blank sex classification. 
Speaking to the Senate hearing on intersex sterilisation in March 2013, Briffa said:

Identity 
Briffa made the following statement: "I am very public about being born biologically partially female and partially male and that I was raised as a girl and lived as a woman until I was 30. I ask all my friends and colleagues to respect my sex as what nature made me; both female and male." On her website Briffa posted: “I feel very comfortable having accepted my true nature. I am not male or female, but both. I am grateful for the years I lived as a woman and the insight and experiences it gave me. I am still ‘Antoinette’ and have now also incorporated and accepted my male (‘Anthony’ or ‘Tony’) side. I feel whole. I’ll continue to live as Tony but I feel I am now at a point in my life where I can celebrate being different.”

Briffa uses she/her pronouns.

Marriage 
Legal issues presented by Tony Briffa's non-specific birth certificate meant that Briffa could not lawfully marry in Australia until late 2017. On 27 September 2013, Tony Briffa married Manja Sommeling in Dunedin, New Zealand. Intersex Human Rights Australia notes:

See also 
 Intersex people and military service in Australia

References

External links

Hobson's Bay Council web page

Intersex Human Rights Australia
Intersex Peer Support Australia

Australian people of Maltese descent
Living people
1971 births
Australian activists
Intersex politicians
Intersex rights activists
Intersex rights in Australia
Intersex rights in Malta
Intersex women
LGBT mayors of places in Australia
Mayors of places in Victoria (Australia)
21st-century LGBT people
Deputy mayors of places in Australia
People from Altona, Victoria